The 2018 season was Southern Vipers' third season, in which they competed in the Women's Cricket Super League, a Twenty20 competition. The side finished bottom of the group stage, winning two of their ten matches.

The side was captained by Suzie Bates and coached by Nicholas Denning. They played three of their home matches at the Rose Bowl and one home match apiece at the Arundel Castle Cricket Ground and the County Ground, Hove.

Squad
Southern Vipers announced a 15-player squad on 5 July 2018. Tash Farrant was ruled out of the squad during the tournament due to injury and replaced by Emily Windsor for the final four group-stage matches. Age given is at the start of Southern Vipers' first match of the season (22 July 2018).

Women's Cricket Super League

Season standings

 Advanced to the Final.
 Advanced to the Semi-final.

League stage

Statistics

Batting

Bowling

Fielding

Wicket-keeping

References

Southern Vipers seasons
2018 in English women's cricket